"Like This and Like That" is a song by American singer Monica. It was written by Dallas Austin, Colin Wolfe, and Malik Edwards, and produced by the former two. It was released as the second single along with "Before You Walk Out of My Life" from Monica's debut studio album, Miss Thang (1995). The song is built around a sample of "Spoonin' Rap" (1979) by American hip hop trio The Sugarhill Gang, written by Gabriel Jackson. Mr. Malik from former rap duo Illegal performs several ad-libs and sings part of the bridge, earning him a place as a featured artist on the track.

Track listing

Credits and personnel
Credits lifted from the album's liner notes.

Monica Arnold – vocals
Dallas Austin – production, writing
Leslie Brathwaite – recording
Debra Killings – backing vocals
Mr. Malik – vocals

Kevin Parker – mixing assistance, recording*
Rick Sheppard – programming
Brian Smith – recording assistance
Alvin Speights – mixing
Colin Wolfe – bass, production, writing

Charts

Weekly charts

Year-end charts

See also
R&B number-one hits of 1996 (USA)

References

External links

1995 songs
1996 singles
Monica (singer) songs
Song recordings produced by Dallas Austin
Songs written by Dallas Austin
New jack swing songs